Trachypogon is a small genus of African and Latin American plants in the grass family. Crinkleawn grass is a common name for plants in this genus.

 Species
 Trachypogon chevalieri (Stapf) Jacq.-Fél. - western + central Africa
 Trachypogon macroglossus Trin. - Cuba, Puerto Rico, Brazil
 Trachypogon spicatus (L.f.) Kuntze - Africa, Madagascar, South America, Central America, Mexico, West Indies, United States (AZ NM TX FL)
 Trachypogon vestitus Andersson - Central + South America from Honduras to Brazil

 formerly included
see Bothriochloa Cymbopogon Heteropogon Hyparrhenia Sorghastrum Sorghum

References

Andropogoneae
Poaceae genera